Dypsis beentjei is an acaulescent flowering plant belonging to the family of palm trees, Arecaceae.

Description 
It is a clustering acaulescent palm with subterranean and procumbent stems. Stem is 4 by 1.4 cm, a dull brown, with 2 mm diameter roots.

Distribution 

References 

beentjei
Endemic flora of Madagascar
Taxa named by John Dransfield
Plants described in 1995